Trumpia is an American SaaS text messaging and marketing automation company. It specializes in SMS marketing and multi-channel automated messaging. Trumpia’s services are designed for marketing, internal communications, customer service, and other use cases for  organizations including Fortune 500’s.

In 2022, Forbes Advisor ranked Trumpia as one of the “Best Mass Texting Services of 2022”, and picked it as the SMS service that is “Best for Marketing Campaigns.”

History
Trumpia was founded in 2006. The company is headquartered in Anaheim, California. Trumpia first established its reputation in mass texting and SMS marketing. Trumpia is now known as a pioneer in the emerging field of SMS automation. It is recognized to be a leader in automated engagement using text messages, email, and automation technologies.

The company’s latest advancement is an automated workflow builder called Trumpia Workbench. Workbench is designed to help Trumpia’s customers boost revenue, customer engagement, and employee satisfaction. Workbench can create customized workflows without the need for a programmer and simplifies creating workflows with drag-and-drop technology.

Services
Common use cases for Trumpia’s messaging include mass alerts, automated reminders, SMS marketing, and contact collection and targeting tools.

Trumpia offers pre-built automated workflows and applets that can be customized to help companies carry out personalized interactions with their customers without having to spend time developing, coding, or relying on their IT department.

Trumpia offers 365-day customer support, dedicated account managers, campaign management, compliance consulting, and a custom development team that can build applications for their customers.

Trumpia offers an affiliate marketing program as well as a full-service white-label reseller program, allowing resellers to customize their pricing tiers and the features that each tier offers.

Features
Trumpia's messaging features include:

 Mass texting that can send messages to an entire customer list in seconds.
 Trumpia’s “Smart Targeting” allows customers to send highly personalized messages to subsets of subscribers.
 Automated Workflows that can carry out automated messaging campaigns for customers without manual intervention.
 Trumpia Workbench comes with prebuilt use case templates which can be edited in minutes.
 MMS picture messaging, allowing customers to send photos, videos, and other media.
 Data capture can collect customer information and store it to Trumpia’s database for further targeting.
 Unlimited text keywords that gather contacts and opt them into messaging campaigns. 
 Appointment reminders that automatically send messages about upcoming events.
 Two-way texting enables customers to carry out conversations with their contacts directly from their Trumpia inbox.
 Access Control that can limit features based on the user's role or location.
 Integrations that allow Trumpia to send messages when triggers are activated in supported programs.
 Developer API that can send both email and text messages, as well as prebuilt contact collection and database management tools.
 365-day support is available, including holidays and weekends.

Awards and recognition 

 Forbes Advisor ranked Trumpia as one of the “Best Mass Texting Services of 2022”, and picked it as the top SMS service that is “Best for Marketing Campaigns.”
 In 2022, Trumpia was featured on CNN for their work with FEMA to connect the public with available emergency shelters via text.
 The New Jersey Department of Health used Trumpia for their COVID-19 contact tracing initiative in 2020.
 Inc. 5000 named Trumpia as 515th overall for the Inc. 5000 List of fastest-growing companies in 2012.
 Website Magazine named Trumpia in the Top 3 position for the "Top 50 Movers and Shakers in Mobile Services." in 2011.

See also
Multi-channel marketing
Mobile marketing
Email marketing
Social media marketing
 Unified communications
 Infobip
 Textlocal
 TextMagic

References

External links
Trumpia website
Trumpia SMS API
Trumpia's Workbench - Automated Workflow Builder

Software companies based in California
Software companies established in 2006
Software companies of the United States
American companies established in 2006